The Holden HX is a range of automobiles which was produced by Holden in Australia from 1976 to 1977.

Changes
The HX series was released in July 1976  and featured a range of models developed from those in the superseded Holden HJ range, which had been in production since 1974. The HX models featured only minor updates to the exterior, notably the grille and badgework. However significant changes were made to the engines to meet new Australian emissions regulations. During the course of the HX series, front bucket seats were adopted as standard equipment for Kingswood-badged vehicles.

Model range 
The mainstream passenger car range consisted of 4-door sedan and 5-door wagon body styles in three trim levels.
 Belmont Sedan
 Kingswood Sedan
 Premier Sedan
 Belmont Wagon
 Kingswood Wagon
 Premier Wagon

The Premier models were differentiated from the cheaper variants by a four headlight frontal treatment. Wagons rode on a wheelbase which was 76 mm (three inches) longer than that of the sedans.

Two special-build HX Kingswood variants emerged later in production. A Kingswood Silver Anniversary model was released in November 1976 to celebrate 50 years of General Motors in Australia and a Kingswood Deluxe sedan and wagon was also introduced during the HX model life in September 1977 with a 4.2 litre V8 as standard.

For the HX series the performance oriented Monaro range was reduced to one model only, the Monaro GTS Sedan. The Monaro LS & GTS coupes were not carried in from the HJ series however a Holden Limited Edition coupe was released in September 1976. This utilised the Monaro coupe body but not the Monaro name.

The commercial vehicle range included coupe utility, panel van and cab chassis truck models:
 Ute
 Kingswood Ute
 Sandman Ute
 Van
 Kingswood Van
 Sandman Van
 One Tonner

The base models were marketed simply as the Holden Ute and Holden Van and both retained the HJ style grille. The Kingswood Van was an addition to the commercial vehicle range  and the One Tonner was a chassis cab vehicle which featured its own unique frontal treatment, carried over from its HJ predecessor.

The Sandman Ute and Van were equipped with various features from the Monaro GTS and featured side stripes and a large 'Sandman' logo on the tailgate.

Engines 
A 3.3-litre inline six-cylinder engine was available, as were 4.2-litre and 5.0-litre V8s. All were modified low-emission units to comply with the new ADR27A regulations, and were notably less powerful than their predecessors. The 2.8-litre inline six available in the HJ series had been deleted, and the Monaro GTS and Holden Limited Edition models were only offered with the eight-cylinder engines.

Production 
The Holden HX was replaced by the Holden HZ series in October 1977, HX production having totalled 110,669 units.

Statesman HX

The Statesman HX range of long-wheelbase luxury sedans developed from the Holden HX series was also released in July 1976. Like their HJ predecessors, the two models in the Statesman HX range, the de Ville and the Caprice, were marketed as Statesmans rather than as Holdens.

References

Cars of Australia
HX
Cars introduced in 1976
1970s cars